Asociación Cultural y Deportiva Guaraní Foot-Ball Club, best known as Guaraní de Trinidad, is a Paraguayan football club based in the district of Trinidad, Itapúa Department. It was founded on 12 October 1960 and currently plays in the Primera División B Nacional, the third division league for clubs outside Gran Asunción in Paraguayan football.

History
Guaraní de Trinidad was founded on 12 October 1960 and joined the Liga Alto Paraná de Fútbol, a regional competition affiliated to the Unión del Fútbol del Interior (UFI) for football clubs from Hohenau and nearby districts such as Bella Vista, Jesús, Obligado, Pirapó and Trinidad. They won the Liga Alto Paraná competition three times in a row between 2017 and 2019.

The club entered the Campeonato Nacional B "Pre-Intermedia" (third tier competition organized by the UFI) for the first time in 2019, reaching the final where they defeated the team representing the Liga Carapegüeña (known as Sportivo Carapeguá in competitions organized by the Paraguayan Football Association) with a 4–2 aggregate score to earn direct promotion to the División Intermedia for the 2020 season. However, their debut in the latter competition was postponed to 2021 since the competition was not held in 2020 due to the COVID-19 pandemic.

Guaraní de Trinidad played in División Intermedia for two seasons, placing 11th in 2021 and 13th in the following season. However, they were relegated back to Primera B Nacional at the end of the 2022 season as they ended up in the bottom three places of the relegation table. Their relegation was confirmed on the last matchday of the tournament, with Guaraní losing 2–1 to Sportivo Luqueño.

Honours
Primera División B Nacional:
 Winners (1): 2019

Liga Alto Paraná de Fútbol:
 Winners (3): 2017, 2018, 2019

Current squad

References

External links
 Guaraní de Trinidad at Soccerway

Football clubs in Paraguay
Association football clubs established in 1960
1960 establishments in Paraguay